Roche Harbor Seaplane Base  is a public-use seaplane base located adjacent to Roche Harbor,  on San Juan Island in San Juan County, Washington, United States. It is owned by the Roche Harbor Resort.

Facilities and aircraft 
Roche Harbor Seaplane Base has two seaplane landing areas: NE/SW is 5,000 by 1,000 feet (1,524 x 305 m) and NW/SE is 2,500 by 500 feet (762 x 152 m). For the 12-month period ending May 31, 2009, the airport had 2,800 aircraft operations, an average of 233 per month: 57% air taxi and 43% general aviation.

Airlines and destinations

References

External links 
 Aerial image as of 10 July 1990 from USGS The National Map

Airports in Washington (state)
Airports in San Juan County, Washington
Seaplane bases in the United States